Reckless Speed is a 1924 American silent action film directed by William James Craft and starring Frank Merrill, Virginia Warwick and Joseph W. Girard.

Synopsis
The son of an oil magnate discovers that the foreman of their works is secretly in league with a rival company. He joins forces with a female reporter to expose the wrongdoers.

Cast
 Frank Merrill as Speed Creswell
 Virginia Warwick as 	Vera Wray
 Joseph W. Girard as Dad Creswell 
 Gino Corrado as David Brierly
 Eddie O'Brien as Creswell's valet
 Slim Cole as Mr. Jackson

References

Bibliography
 Connelly, Robert B. The Silents: Silent Feature Films, 1910-36, Volume 40, Issue 2. December Press, 1998.
 Munden, Kenneth White. The American Film Institute Catalog of Motion Pictures Produced in the United States, Part 1. University of California Press, 1997.

External links
 

1924 films
1920s action films
American silent feature films
American action films
American black-and-white films
Films directed by William James Craft
1920s English-language films
1920s American films